The Walter HWK 109-500 was a liquid-fuelled rocket engine developed by Walter in Germany during the Second World War.

Description 
The 109-500 is a self-contained, modular monopropellant Starthilfe (take-off assist) engine in a pod, able to produce  thrust for thirty seconds. After the fuel was expended, the pod was jettisoned and it returned to earth by parachute, with the parachute packed externally, onto the blunt forward end of the pod.

The T-Stoff monopropellant, stored in the large spherical tank within the Starthilfe module's forward end, needed to react with a catalyst to provide the boosting thrust for an aircraft on takeoff - this Z-Stoff sodium or calcium-based, alkaline permanganate-compound (in an aqueous solution) catalyst was provided in a small tank above the reaction chamber just forward of the exhaust nozzle, with compressed air from a network of five pressure tanks driving the monopropellant and catalyst together through the reaction chamber, which featured an internal, fixed helical "swirl baffle" to lengthen the period of time the monopropellant and catalyst were in contact for a more complete catalytic reaction within it, before the reacted T-Stoff exhaust exited the nozzle.

It entered service in 1942, and some 6,000 were built, by Heinkel. It was "used extensively on a wide range of aircraft", especially the potentially underpowered (when heavily laden with external ordnance) Jumo 004-engined Arado Ar 234B, with two of the units uniquely displayed as mounted operationally on the NASM's sole surviving, restored Ar 234B.

Applications
Arado Ar 234
Blohm & Voss BV 138
Junkers Ju 88
Heinkel He 111
Messerschmitt Me 321
Messerschmitt Me 323

Specifications

See also

Notes

External links

 
 British 'Walterwerke' Reference Page on HWK 109-500 Starthilfe RATO Unit
 Polish Aviation Museum online infopage on the uprated, experimental HWK 109-501 RATO booster

Aircraft rocket engines
109-500
JATO
Rocket engines using cold cycle hydrogen peroxide propellant